This is a list of prisons within Fujian province of the People's Republic of China.

Sources 
 

Buildings and structures in Fujian
Fujian